is an interchange passenger railway station in the Noborito neighborhood of Tama-ku, Kawasaki, Kanagawa Prefecture, Japan, operated by East Japan Railway Company (JR East) and the private railway company Odakyu Electric Railway.

Lines 

Station layout 
JR Noborito Station has one side platform and one island platform serving three elevated tracks, connected by an underpass. The station has a Midori no Madoguchi stuffed ticket office. Odakyu Noborito Station is an elevated station with two island platforms serving four elevated tracks.

JR platforms

Odakyu platforms

History 
Noborito Station opened as a station on the Nambu Railway on 9 March 1927.
The Nambu Railway was nationalized on 1 April 1944 becoming part of the Japanese Government Railway (JGR) system, which became the Japan National Railways (JNR) from 1949.
The adjacent Odawara Line station was renamed  on April 1955, and the name shortened to its present name on 1 April 1958.
Freight services were discontinued on the Nambu Line from 1 April 1972. Along with privatization and division of JNR, JR East started operating the Nambu Line station on 1 April 1987. The station building and platforms were extensively remodelled from 2003-2007.

Station numbering was introduced to the Odakyu Line in January 2014 with Noborito being assigned station number OH18.

Passenger statistics
In fiscal 2019, the JR station was used by an average of 82,838 passengers daily (boarding passengers only). During the same period, the Odakyu Station was used by 167,685 passengers daily (total).

The daily passenger figures (boarding passengers only) for previous years are as shown below.

See also
List of railway stations in Japan

References

External links

 JR East Station information 
 Odakyu Station information 

Railway stations in Kanagawa Prefecture
Railway stations in Japan opened in 1927
Odakyu Odawara Line
Stations of East Japan Railway Company
Stations of Odakyu Electric Railway
Railway stations in Kawasaki, Kanagawa